The second siege of Fort Henry took place from September 11 to 13, 1782, during the American Revolutionary War.  A force of about 300 Wyandot, Shawnee, Seneca and Lenape laid siege to Fort Henry, an American outpost at what is now Wheeling, West Virginia, accompanied by a force of 50 Loyalist soldiers from Butler's Rangers, a provincial military unit. The siege is commonly known as "The Last Battle of the Revolutionary War," despite subsequent skirmishes between Patriots and Loyalists involving the loss of life taking place in New Jersey later in 1782. However, these were unorganized outbreaks of fighting between patrons with opposing sentiments rather than engagements between belligerents.

Background

Fort Henry rests just off the Ohio River in what is now Wheeling, West Virginia, between the southeast border of Ohio and northwest border of West Virginia.  The colonists were disobeying royal order that all land west of the Appalachian Mountains was reserved for Native Americans, and the area had a history of violence between the natives and settlers. The large force of Native Americans gathered on the Sandusky River under the direction of Simon Girty. Girty had been captured by natives as a child and grew up in their society, gaining notoriety for his savagery towards settlers. This force met with Butler's Rangers and the entire company was put under the direction of Captain Pratt. The Rangers, a Loyalist Provincial unit from New York, had participated with Native Americans in the massacre of Patriot prisoners, women and children early in the war during the 1778 Wyoming and Cherry Valley massacres.

Siege and aftermath

As the force arrived at Fort Henry, the Zane family, under direction of Colonel David Shephard, was charged with defending the fort. The defending force was made up of 40 men and boys protecting the 60 women and children from the surrounding area who had come to the fort for protection. Girty and Pratt demanded surrender but Shephard refused, resolving to fight to the death in order to protect the people within his fort. The settlers were prepared to handle this siege because a similar force of British-allied Native Americans had attacked the fort before and burned all of the homes and buildings to the ground. Between the former siege and this one, the wooden model cannon that previously rested on the barracks had been replaced by a real one. In addition the homes of the settlers had been rebuilt, including that of Ebenezer Zane. His home contained a store of surplus ammunition and arms and it had been decided to occupy it in case of another attack. 

Having been notified of the approach of the enemy by a scout named John Lynn, preparations were speedily made for the expected attack. Those who remained within the Zane house were Andrew Scott, George Green, Elizabeth Zane (Colonel Zane's wife), Molly Scott, Miss McCulloch, a sister of Major Samuel McCulloch, a slave and his wife, "Daddy Sam" and Kate. From all other homes the occupants had entered the fort. Although Colonel David Shepherd was the superior officer in the county, it appears that Colonel Silas Zane was again in command. The first siege attempts were entirely aimed at destruction of the fort and surrounding area. The whole first day was wasted in attempting to batter the fort and burn down buildings. On the first night natives attempted to burn down Colonel Zane's cabin, but Daddy Sam saw the native and killed him just before the house was set on fire.

Betty Zane's resupply attempt

The cannon was used heavily in defense of this first attempt, being fired 16 times with such effectiveness that the Indians and Loyalists attempted to replicate the cannon out of a hollowed out tree wrapped in chains. When they attempted firing their makeshift cannon it exploded, killing and injuring the natives standing around. As the men defended against attacks the first day, the women in the fort had been pouring lead into bullet molds and dipping them into water. During the second siege on the following day, the settlers encountered trouble. Their supply of gunpowder was running low and they would not be able to defend the fort much longer if they lost use of the cannon and their rifles. 

Elizabeth "Betty" Zane remembered the store of powder in her brother's cabin, and volunteered to retrieve it for three reasons. First, the enemy would be less inclined to shoot a woman, and with only twenty men of fighting age still able, they could not spare any of them. Second, she knew exactly where the store was kept in the cabin. Third, she was young, and strong enough to carry the store of powder from the cabin back to the fort. What Betty Zane did not tell was that she had gone 40 hours without sleep as she was molding bullets for the Virginia militiamen defending Fort Henry. 

At about noon on the second day of the siege, Betty Zane opened the front gate of Fort Henry and walked the 60 yards to Ebenezer Zane's cabin. There was a pause in the fighting while the besieging Indian and Loyalists stared in awe as she disappeared into the cabin. Betty was not as lucky on her return trip. As she wrapped the powder store in her apron and left the cabin to return to the fort, the attackers recognized what she had and opened fire on her. She ran the 60 yards up the hill to the fort and made it safely inside unharmed by the Indians and Loyalists attacking the fort. The powder allowed the settlers to defend the fort until help arrived. In the morning the Indian and Loyalists left as Captain John Boggs arrived with 70 men to aid Fort Henry.

Legacy

The community of Betty Zane near Wheeling, West Virginia, was named after her. More than one hundred years after her death, John S. Adams wrote a poem called "Elizabeth Zane" that achieved some acclaim. Betty Zane's great-grandnephew, the author Zane Grey, wrote a historical novel about her, titled Betty Zane, also republished as The Last Ranger. One of the main events in the story is the tale of Zane's fetching supplies from the family cabin.  When Grey could not find a publisher for the book, he published it himself in 1903 using his wife's money. Grey later named his daughter Betty Zane after his famous aunt.

References

1782 in the United States
Fort Henry (1782)
Battles involving Native Americans
Fort Henry (1782)[
Conflicts in 1782
Sieges involving Great Britain
Sieges involving the United States
Sieges of the American Revolutionary War
Wheeling, West Virginia